Movements are a post-hardcore band from Rancho Santa Margarita, California, formed in 2015.

The band was signed to a record contract with Fearless Records after playing just one show in 2015. They have released an EP, Outgrown Things (2016), and two albums, Feel Something (2017) and No Good Left to Give (2020). Feel Something peaked at 190 on the Billboard 200 chart.

History
Movements was formed in January 2015 by guitarist Brett Chiodo and Patrick Miranda and soon recruited drummer Spencer York, and bassist Austin Cressey.

They self-released their first single, "Protection" on January 31, 2015  and played their first show opening for Have Mercy in March 2015. A second single, "Buried" was released on March 17. A third single, "Scripted" was released on April 14. After only one local gig, the band signed a three record deal with Fearless Records in August 2015.

After recording their first EP, Outgrown Things, guitarist Brett Chiodo left the band in January 2016. and was replaced by guitarist Ira George. 

Their debut EP, produced by Will Yip, Outgrown Things was released on March 11, 2016. The album reached 42 on the Indie charts. That month, the band toured with Real Friends on a tour where tickets were only $5 and the bands played in unconventional places such as bowling alleys and skateparks.

In April 2017, they were nominated for "Best Underground Band" at the 2017 Alternative Press Music Awards.

The band played the entirety of the 2017 Warped Tour. During one set of the tour, vocalist Patrick Miranda helped fill-in for Counterparts vocalist Brendan Murphy who had to miss the show due to a family emergency.

Over the course of the tours, the band spent over a year and a half writing new music for their upcoming debut album.
On September 28, 2017, the band released the music video for their first single of their debut album. "Colorblind" features a music video in which the band's lyrics are projected onto the sides of houses and buildings. The album, Feel Something, was also produced by Will Yip, and released on October 20, 2017. The album made reached number two on the Billboards Top New Artist Albums Chart and peaked at number 190 on the Billboard 200. The band themselves peaked at number 23 on the Emerging Artists chart.

In November 2017, they were scheduled to tour Europe with Knuckle Puck, Tiny Moving Parts and Have Mercy. However, Knuckle Puck canceled the tour. In 2018 they embarked on a headlining tour with Can't Swim, Super Whatevr and Gleemer. Afterwards, they will go on a UK tour with Muskets and Paerish. The band performed a DJ set at Emo Nite Day hosted by Emo Nite in Los Angeles in December 2017.

In March 2018, the band released a music video for the song "Deadly Dull". The band teamed up with Alzheimer’s Association  for the video to spread awareness.
In November 2018, they released a cover of R.E.M.'s "Losing My Religion" as part of Songs that Saved My Life compilation released on Hopeless Records.

Musical style, lyrics and influence
The band's music is a mixture of post-hardcore, alternative rock, and spoken word. They are considered part of the emo revival movement.

Vocalist Patrick Miranda has been diagnosed with obsessive–compulsive disorder and has struggled with depression and anxiety, struggles that heavily influence the band's lyrics. Other lyrical themes include heartbreak and tense relationships with parents. The song "Deadly Dull" is written about Alzheimer's disease, which Miranda's grandmother suffered from.

The band was influenced by artists such as Title Fight, Balance and Composure,  My Chemical Romance, Underoath, The Devil Wears Prada and Good Charlotte.

Members

Current members
Patrick Miranda – vocals (2015–present)
Austin Cressey – bass guitar, rhythm guitar (2015–present)
Spencer York – drums (2015–present)
Ira George – lead guitar (2016–present)

Former members
Brett Chiodo – lead guitar (2015–2016)

Discography

Studio albums

Extended plays

Singles
"Protection" (2015)
"Buried" (2015) 
"Scripted"  (2015)
"Kept" (2016)
"Nineteen" (2016)
"Hatchet (Catacomb Sessions) (2016)
"Colorblind" (2017)
"Deadly Dull" (2018)
"Losing My Religion" (2018)
"Don't Give Up Your Ghost" (2020)
"Skin to Skin" (2020)
"Tunnel Vision" (2020)
"Barbed Wire Body" (2022)
"Cherry Thrill" (2022)

Awards and nominations

References

External links
 
 

Emo musical groups from California
Emo revival groups
Musical groups established in 2015
Fearless Records artists
2015 establishments in California